Formed in 1980, the Australian Garden History Society (AGHS) is an Australian history society dedicated to the study of Australian garden history and the conservation of  significant landscapes and historic gardens.

There are AGHS branches in most states and the national headquarters of the society is in Melbourne, Victoria. Membership of the group increased during the 1980s  and 1990s peaking at over 2,000 at the turn of the 21st century. The society publishes a journal called Australian Garden History and hosts an annual conference which combines the reading of academic papers with garden visits. The organisation has a web site that includes news items and a list of events.

Notable publications produced by the group include: The Oxford Companion to Australian Gardens published by the AGHS in association with Oxford University Press in 2002. A history of the society, Visions and Voices, was published in 2006.

See also

 Garden History Society
 Historic garden conservation

References

External links
 Australian Garden History Society

Horticultural organisations based in Australia
Clubs and societies in Australia
1980 establishments in Australia
Garden design history
Historical societies of Australia